Mali Kum is a small village on the southern slopes of Mount Kum in the Municipality of Zagorje ob Savi in central Slovenia. The area is part of the traditional region of Lower Carniola. It is now included with the rest of the municipality in the Central Sava Statistical Region.

References

External links
Mali Kum on Geopedia

Populated places in the Municipality of Zagorje ob Savi